Hot is a live album by Canadian jazz pianist Paul Bley recorded in 1985 and released on the Italian Soul Note label.

Reception
The Allmusic review by Ron Wynn awarded the album 2½ stars, stating: "Excellent playing by Bley keeps things moving on this '85 date. The songs vary in quality, but Bley's moving, teeming solos are consistently impressive, and the production and sound are excellent."

Track listing
All compositions by Paul Bley except as indicated
 "When Will the Blues Leave?" (Ornette Coleman) - 12:15 
 "Around Again" (Carla Bley) - 8:04 
 "How Long" - 5:03 
 "Mazatlan" - 10:50 
 "Syndrome" (Carla Bley) - 8:00 
Recorded at Lush Life in New York City on March 10, 1985.

Personnel
 Paul Bley — piano 
 John Scofield — guitar
Steve Swallow — electric bass
Barry Altschul — drums

References

Black Saint/Soul Note albums
Paul Bley albums
1985 albums